NGC 5164 is a barred spiral galaxy in the constellation Ursa Major. It was discovered by William Herschel on April 14, 1789.

References

External links

Barred spiral galaxies
Ursa Major (constellation)
5164
08458
047124